Volleyball events were contested at the 1973 Summer Universiade in Moscow, Soviet Union.

References
 Universiade volleyball medalists on HickokSports

U
1973 Summer Universiade
Volleyball at the Summer Universiade
International volleyball competitions hosted by the Soviet Union
1973 in Soviet sport